Jóel Sigurðsson (5 November 1924 – 28 November 2003) was an Icelandic athlete. He competed in the men's javelin throw at the 1948 Summer Olympics.

References

1924 births
2003 deaths
Athletes (track and field) at the 1948 Summer Olympics
Jóel Sigurðsson
Jóel Sigurðsson
Sportspeople from Reykjavík